Shiriuchi Dam  is a gravity dam located in Hokkaido Prefecture in Japan. The dam is used for irrigation. The catchment area of the dam is 15.1 km2. The dam impounds about 46  ha of land when full and can store 6500 thousand cubic meters of water. The construction of the dam was started on 1980 and completed in 1993.

References

Dams in Hokkaido